Jack Sears (16 February 1930 – 6 August 2016) was a British race and rally driver, and was one of the principal organisers of the 1968 London-Sydney Marathon.

Biography
Sears was popularly known as "Gentleman Jack". His son David is also involved in motorsport. 

He won the inaugural British Saloon Car Championship in 1958, driving an Austin Westminster. After finishing on joint maximum points with Tommy Sopwith, it was initially suggested the champion would be decided by the toss of a coin. The idea was very unpopular with both drivers and at the final meeting at Brands Hatch, with a draw being a likely possibility, two identical looking Marcus Chambers-owned Riley One-Point-Five works rally cars were brought along for a five lap shoot-out. To make the race fair, they raced five laps, switched cars, then raced five laps again with the driver who had the quickest combined time being crowned champion. In pouring rain, Sears became the first ever champion by 1.6 seconds.

He regained the title in 1963, driving a variety of cars including a Ford Cortina GT, a seven-litre Ford Galaxie and a Lotus Cortina, which was used for the final two races. Sears also co-drove a Ferrari 330 LMB with Mike Salmon to a fifth place in the 1963 Le Mans 24 Hours, the best result in the abbreviated racing history of the LMB.

Death
Sears died on 6 August 2016 from lung cancer. He had previously survived a heart attack.

Racing record

Complete British Saloon Car Championship results
(key) (Races in bold indicate pole position; races in italics indicate fastest lap.)

† Events with 2 races staged for the different classes.

‡ Event with 3 races staged for the different classes.

 Car over 1000cc - Not eligible for points.

24 Hours of Le Mans results

References

External links
Profile of Jack Sears, HistoricRacing.com
Account of the route of the London-Sydney Marathon, written by Jack Sears who reconnoitred the event
BSCC Results

1930 births
2016 deaths
English racing drivers
British Touring Car Championship drivers
British Touring Car Championship Champions
Brighton Speed Trials people
24 Hours of Le Mans drivers
World Sportscar Championship drivers
Deaths from lung cancer in the United Kingdom

12 Hours of Reims drivers